Elle Kennedy is a Canadian bestselling author of contemporary romance and romantic suspense. She has published books with Harlequin Enterprises, New American Library, Berkley, and Entangled Publishing. She received her B.A. in English from York University in 2005. She has had multiple titles on the USA Today, The New York Times and The Wall Street Journal bestsellers lists. Her highly popular Off-Campus series has appeared on multiple bestsellers lists and will release in over twenty countries worldwide.

Bibliography

Prep Series 

 Misfit (2023)
 Rogue (2023)

Avalon Bay Series 

 Good Girl Complex (2022)
 Bad Girl Reputation (2022)
 The Summer Girl (2023)

Off Campus Series 

 The Deal (2015)
 The Mistake (2015)
 The Score (2016)
 The Goal  (2016)
 The Legacy (2021)

Briar U Series (spinoff from Off Campus) 

 The Chase (2018)
 The Risk (2019)
 The Play (2019)
 The Dare (2020)

Killer Instincts 

 Midnight Rescue (2012)
 Midnight Alias (2013)
 Midnight Games (2013)
 Midnight Pursuits (2014)
 Midnight Action (2014)
 Midnight Captive (2015)
 Midnight Revenge (2016)
 Midnight Target (2017)

Harlequin Romantic Suspense 

 Missing Mother-To-Be (2011)
 Millionaire's Last Stand (2011)
 The Heartbreak Sheriff (2012)

Silhouette Romantic Suspense 

 Her Private Avenger (2010)
 Silent Watch (2009)

Harlequin Blaze 

 Witness Seduction (2011)
 Body Check (2009)

Out of Uniform Series 

 Heat of the Moment (2008)
 Heat of Passion (2009)
 Heat of the Storm (2009)
 Heat it Up (2010)
 Heat of the Night (2010)
 The Heat is On (2011)
 Feeling Hot (2012)
 Getting Hotter (2012)

Him Series with Sarina Bowen 

 Him (2016)
 Us (2017)

Awards and nominations
 2016 - RITA Winner - Contemporary Romance: Mid-Length for Him co-written with Sarina Bowen
 2015 - People's Choice Awards Best Romance nominee for The Deal
 2015 - Goodreads Best Romance finalist for The Deal and The Score
 2014 - RITA Finalist - Romantic Suspense for Midnight Action
 2010 - RITA Finalist - Contemporary Series Romance: Suspense/Adventure for Silent Watch
 2009 - Romantic Times Reviewers' Choice Best Book Awards – Nominee for Silent Watch

References

External links 
 
 Elle Kennedy at eHarlequin

1982 births
Living people
Canadian romantic fiction writers
Canadian women novelists
Women romantic fiction writers
Canadian erotica writers
Women erotica writers
York University alumni
21st-century Canadian novelists
21st-century Canadian women writers